Lycia de Biase Bidart (18 February 1910 – 10 July 1991) was a Brazilian pianist, violinist, conductor, music educator and composer.

Life and career
Lycia de Biase was born in Vitoria, Espirito Santo, the daughter of Commander Pietrângelo De Biase, born in Castellucci Superiore, Italy (1884) and Maria Arcângela Vivacqua De Biase, born in Muniz Freire, Espirito Santo. Lycia began her studies in Rio de Janeiro with Neusa Franca for piano and Giovanni Giannetti for harmony and composition, and later continued her studies with Magdalena Tagliaferro.

She married João Baptista Bidart.

Works
Selected works include:
A noiva do mar, opera, 1939
Estudos expressionistas for two horns
Cantos tupis for horn, flute and clarinet, 1975

References

1910 births
1990 deaths
20th-century classical composers
Women classical composers
Brazilian classical composers
20th-century women composers